is a Japanese football player. He currently plays for Thespakusatsu Gunma in the J2 League. His playing position is either attacking midfielder or forward.

Club career

Born and raised in Osaka, Takagi came through the youth ranks at Gamba Osaka and joined the senior squad for the first time in 2014 at the age of 17.   He made his debut on 16 April 2014 in a 2-0 J.League Cup victory away to Sagan Tosu.   He started the game and was replaced by Akihiro Sato after 71 minutes.

He didn't play at all in 2015 or 2016 before finding himself in Gamba's starting line up towards the back end of the 2017 season where he played a total of 7 league matches and 2 AFC Champions League games without getting his name on the scoresheet.

Gamba changed head coaches ahead of the 2018 season with Brazilian Levir Culpi replacing the long serving Kenta Hasegawa and this saw a big reduction in Takagi's top team playing time as neither Culpi nor mid-season replacement Tsuneyasu Miyamoto could find space for Takagi in their starting line-ups and he was restricted to a mere 1 J.League Cup substitute appearance against Urawa Red Diamonds.

In 2016, Gamba's Under-23 side joined J3 League along with the reserve teams of FC Tokyo and Cerezo Osaka. Takagi featured for them often in their inaugural campaign, netting once in 23 appearances as they finished 9th in the overall standings. The team was run more as a youth team in 2017 and owing to this as well as his involvement with Gamba's first team, he only played once throughout the year. However in 2018, it was back to being a reserve team again and Takagi put in a stronger showing, playing all 32 games and bagging 5 goals as his team finished 6th in the final league table.

National team career

In May 2017, Takagi was elected Japan U-20 national team for 2017 U-20 World Cup. At this tournament, he played 2 matches.

Club statistics

Last update: 2 December 2018

Reserves performance

Honors

Gamba Osaka

J. League Cup - 2014

References

External links

1997 births
Living people
Association football people from Osaka Prefecture
People from Sakai, Osaka
Japanese footballers
Japan youth international footballers
J1 League players
J2 League players
J3 League players
Gamba Osaka players
Gamba Osaka U-23 players
Montedio Yamagata players
Matsumoto Yamaga FC players
Thespakusatsu Gunma players
Association football forwards